Tshikaji Airport  is an airstrip serving the town of Tshikaji in Kasaï-Central Province, Democratic Republic of the Congo.

See also

 List of airports in the Democratic Republic of the Congo

References

 Tshikaji
 Great Circle Mapper - Tshikaji

External links
 HERE Maps - Tshikaji
 OpenStreetMap - Tshikaji
 OurAirports - Tshikaji

Airports in Kasaï-Central